La Sabana Metropolitan Park is located in downtown San José, Costa Rica. It is the country's largest and most significant urban park. La Sabana is considered "the lungs of San José" by Costa Ricans.

Geography

Several important institutions and organizations are located within or adjacent to the park.

History 
La Sabana Metropolitan Park was officially inaugurated in 1977, though its origins go back two centuries. Manuel Antonio Chapuí, the parish priest of San José at the end of the 17th century, donated several plots of land in the Mata Redonda District "in order to favour Costa Rica's interests". Since that time, the area has been used for recreation and sports activities.

Costa Rica's first president, Juan Mora Fernández, and other josefino personalities devoted themselves to provide the park with several dispositions with the aim of preserving this green area legacy.

For more than 150 years the park developed its characteristic vegetation, spurred by planting campaigns from the citizens. In 1930 this project was halted when the government decided to locate the country's first international airport within the park area. La Sabana International Airport functioned for 44 years, until the opening of the current Juan Santamaría International Airport.

During the decade of the 1960s the idea of turning La Sabana into San José's lungs was taking up again. With that goal, trees, shrubs and grass were planted. In 1977, during the Daniel Oduber Administration,  La Sabana was officially classified as a Metropolitan Park. In 2001 La Sabana was declared a National Architectural Heritage, by an Executive Decree.

Landmarks 
La Sabana Metropolitan Park's most prominent buildings are the country's national stadium and the Costa Rican Art Museum (Museo de Arte Costarricense). Both are sited within the park's green space. The stadium is located above the old stadium's former location. The art museum is housed in the former main building of 'old' La Sabana Airport.

A large artificial lake, several sports fields, running and skating tracks, a gymnasium, and a shooting range are also inside its boundaries. Surrounding the park, several institutions have their main offices. These include the main electricity company of Costa Rica, Instituto Costarricense de Electricidad, and the nation's Contraloría General de la República de Costa Rica (Comptroller General) headquarters.

References

External links
 Mcjdcr.go.cr: Pictures and info about La Sabana Metropolitan Park.
 Ticoartistico.com: Pictures of La Sabana Metropolitan Park.

Parks in Costa Rica
San José, Costa Rica
Urban public parks
San José (canton)
Tourist attractions in San José, Costa Rica